"The Troubled Spirit" is the nineteenth episode of the first season of Space: 1999.  The screenplay was written by Johnny Byrne; the director was Ray Austin.  The final shooting script is dated 11 November 1974.  Live-action filming took place Wednesday 20 November 1974 through Wednesday 4 December 1974.

Synopsis
As the Moon drifts through empty space, the off-duty personnel of Moonbase Alpha gather in the Recreation Section for an evening of music. Playing to a full house, a solo artist performs a haunting piece on an electric sitar. At Hydroponic Unit Two Doctor Dan Mateo and three colleagues are in the midst of an unorthodox experiment. Linked to a transmitting apparatus by electrodes, the four botanists sit holding hands around a table, giving the proceedings the appearance of a scientific séance.

Working from the premise that humans have an innate affinity with plants, Mateo has discovered that botanical life emits electrical waves analogous to those produced by the human brain. In the experiment, Mateo hopes to isolate these brainwave patterns in his own mind, amplify them using the combined mental powers of the group, transmit them at plants sitting on the table and measure the response. The ultimate goal is to establish communication between humans and plants. As the group concentrates, Mateo slips into a trance-state. Doctor James Warren, head of Hydroponics, enters the unit and stops the experiment. When the circle is broken, Mateo spasms in agony and crumples to the floor. Suddenly, the lights dim and a freezing wind blows all throughout Alpha.

John Koenig arrives at Hydroponics with a medical team. Mateo is conveyed to Medical straight away while John questions the other participants. An argument breaks out between Warren and Laura Adams, Mateo's girlfriend and willing accomplice, as Warren repeatedly warned Mateo of the dangers while Laura is furious that Warren's interference could have cost Mateo his life. Their dispute is interrupted by a report that all of Alpha's sections experienced a momentary drop in temperature emanating outward from Hydroponics. Koenig presses Victor Bergman for an explanation, but the professor is stumped. In the Medical Centre, Mateo regains consciousness. After describing his experience to Helena Russell, she advises caution as he seems extremely sensitive to psychic phenomena. When Laura comes to check on him, the couple quarrel when she expresses her concerns over the dangers of continuing the experiment.

Helena ends the spat by administering a sedative to help the now-angry Mateo sleep. As he drifts off, he spies a shadowy form lurking in a dark corner. Seeing Laura out, Helena settles down to do some paperwork. Experiencing a chilling breeze, Helena looks up to find a figure in the shadows make its way to her from Mateo's ward. It steps into the light, revealing one side of its face and hand to be scarred and mutilated. Helena recoils in horror. Minutes later, Koenig arrives with a security team. A thorough search uncovers no sign of Helena's horrific intruder. Mateo, resting in a drugged sleep, is the only other person present. When she relates the details of her bizarre encounter, Koenig is hard-pressed to accept the conclusion that this was some sort of psychic experience. Convinced this encounter is related to Mateo's experiment, he declares the project officially terminated, and Warren dismantles Mateo's equipment.

The following morning, Helena discharges Mateo, who is angry over the order to end his research. Making his way to Hydroponics, Mateo experiences a series of eerie occurrences; the sound of footsteps in empty corridors, doors opening before he uses his commlock, and a sourceless shadow following him in a travel tube. Arriving at Hydroponics, Mateo sees his transmitter dismantled and tossed in a bin. With rage, he charges over to confront Warren. While threatening Warren's life, Mateo is horrified to see that his hand transformed in to a scarred and withered claw. Panicked, Mateo releases Warren and runs from the unit, concealing his hand. When alone, he is baffled when the hand is completely normal.

Despite the assault, Warren remains determined to discharge Mateo from his experiment. A cold wind sweeps through Hydroponics and Warren is attacked by a figure hiding among the plants. Koenig is immediately warned of a temperature drop in Hydroponics and he arrives to find Warren dead. Koenig interrogates Mateo who insists he did not kill him, and was not present when he died. Koenig cites the fact that all the strange events of the past few days seem connected to Mateo and his experiment. Bergman reveals that during each incident, in addition to the drops in temperature, Alpha's instruments have detected Mateo's electrical-wave pattern. Bergman concludes the wave pattern represents a rare and powerful form of psychic energy.

At a command conference, Koenig has trouble convincing the base staff that Alpha is being terrorized by a specter. Bergman and Helena propose that Mateo, while experimenting with the most primitive, least understood segment of the brain, has tapped a latent paranormal power. Some unknown aspect of his work has stimulated this area to a never-before-seen level of activity, resulting in a destructive force capable of killing. During this, Laura finds Mateo in Hydroponics reassembling his device. With Bergman's announcement that his wave pattern is now detectable by conventional means, Mateo is convinced he is on the verge of a breakthrough. Laura pleads with him to stop, frightened by the force he has awakened. Mateo furiously ejects her from the workroom. Threatening to tell Koenig everything, Laura runs for the main hatch and encounters the figure waiting for her on the other side.

With his girlfriend now murdered, the grief-stricken Mateo suffers a breakdown. He admits to threatening both Warren and Laura before their deaths. Mateo feels this force is connected with himself, carrying out his subconscious destructive urges. To bring it out into the open, he asks to recreate his experiment. Koenig agrees and the senior staff assembles in Hydroponics. With the mental power of eight participants, Mateo conjures up a chilling apparition of himself, its right side grotesquely mutilated. The doppelgänger blames Koenig and company for ending its life and says it is a force of vengeance, seeking out those who collaborated in its destruction. During this, Mateo emerges from his trance and is overwhelmed at confronting his own spirit. Mateo collapses and the apparition fades away. Mateo is placed in isolation and heavily sedated.

Koenig and Bergman discuss the situation. The professor is fascinated by the concept of a spirit returning to avenge its death before that death has occurred. Koenig's concern is that this force will continue to grow and begin operating independently. Bridging the gap between science and mysticism, Bergman proposes a scientific exorcism. To bring forth the spirit, Mateo is given mezadrine, a psychotropic drug which induces violent emotions. Bergman then encloses Mateo behind a lethal energy barrier. Mateo awakens, furious to find himself locked in an isolation room and in restraints. His rage builds to the point where he threatens to kill Koenig. With that, the wraith springs from Mateo's body, hurling itself at the commander, only to be repelled by the force-field. Trying to reach Koenig, the spirit repeatedly flings itself against the barrier in a murderous frenzy.

Mateo tears off the restraints and grabs his nemesis by the throat. As they grapple, the spirit gains the upper hand and sadistically holds Mateo's face in contact with the sizzling energy field. Both collapse to the floor in a sudden explosion of blinding energy. Mateo dies and the spirit vanishes. When turned face-up, the John and Helana are horrified to see the face and body burned in the precise manner as the spirit his death has exorcised.

Cast

Starring
 Martin Landau — Commander John Koenig
 Barbara Bain — Doctor Helena Russell

Also Starring
 Barry Morse — Professor Victor Bergman

Guest Artists
 Giancarlo Prete — Doctor Dan Mateo
 Hilary Dwyer — Laura Adams
 Anthony Nicholls — Doctor James Warren

Featuring
 Prentis Hancock — Controller Paul Morrow
 Clifton Jones — David Kano
 Zienia Merton — Sandra Benes
 Anton Phillips — Doctor Bob Mathias
 Nick Tate — Captain Alan Carter

Uncredited Artists
 Suzanne Roquette — Tanya
 Jim Sullivan — Alphan Musician
 Tony Allyn — Security Guard
 Vernon Morris — Male Botanist
 Xanthi Gardner — Female Botanist
 Valentino Musetti — 'Spirit' Mateo

Music

Supplemented by the regular Barry Gray score (drawn primarily from "Another Time, Another Place"), English musician 'Big Jim' Sullivan would compose an eerie, atmospheric composition for the sitar to serve as the primary music track.  Sullivan, a prolific session guitarist of the time, also appeared on camera—dressed in an Alpha uniform, he was the performer seen playing the piece in the story's opening scenes.

Production Notes

 Script editor Johnny Byrne's idea for "The Troubled Spirit" arose from his desire to write a science-fiction ghost story.  He was pleased with the symmetry that organically evolved—the spirit coming to avenge a death that had not yet occurred, and the Alphans, in their attempts to counter the dangerous presence in their midst, actually causing the death they are trying to avert.  In the early 70s, the idea of human-plant communication was a popular concept, as was the notion that the human brain contained many underutilised areas which contained paranormal super-powers.
 Both Byrne and production designer Keith Wilson recall that producer Sylvia Anderson was greatly involved in the creative development of this episode.  Mrs Anderson's usual concerns were production design and the supervision of the actors; executive producer Gerry Anderson normally oversaw the writing staff.  Her interest in Byrne's tale had her running the story meetings for this instalment, rather than her husband.
 In 1973, when RAI had agreed to co-finance the series, they had one stipulation:  the programme would feature Italian talent.  The characters that became Sandra Benes and Alan Carter were originally written as Italian nationals.  Giancarlo Prete had been selected to play 'Captain Alfonso Catani', head of Reconnaissance.  Shortly before production began, the Italian actor resigned, unwilling to commit to the twelve-month stay in England the role would require.  (The part was quickly rewritten and awarded to Nick Tate.)  Prete would be the first of four Italian guest artists chosen to fulfill the agreement.  Sylvia Anderson selected him because he was not intimidated by series' star Martin Landau; Landau's ego, she recounts, was threatened by the Italian actors visiting for screen testing.
 The script contained several differences from the finished episode: (1)  The music programme was written as a string quintet, of which Victor Bergman was a member—this was suggested by the presence of a violin in his quarters in the earlier episode "Alpha Child"; (2) Characters were to have spoken Mateo's given name 'Dan' throughout the segment; in the televised version, everyone only used his surname—including his girlfriend - the cast in fact pronounced it as "Matteo" sounds in Italian, i.e. "Matthew" ; (3) In a scene cut for time (but glimpsed in the 'This Episode' sequence), Bergman demonstrated his method to destroy the spirit: energy matching the spirit's wave pattern, but with reversed polarity.  When in contact, the two opposing forces would cancel each other out.
 The animated energy shimmer seen when the spirit vanishes and is absorbed into Mateo's body was the only new visual effect seen in this instalment; the shots of Moonbase were library footage.  The superimposed images of the spirit were practical effects, done 'in camera' with a half-silvered mirror.

Novelisation

The episode was adapted in the fifth Year One Space: 1999 novel Lunar Attack by John Rankine, published in 1975.

References

External links
Space: 1999 - "The Troubled Spirit" - The Catacombs episode guide
Space: 1999 - "The Troubled Spirit" - Moonbase Alpha's Space: 1999 page

1976 British television episodes
Space: 1999 episodes